The WSFA Small Press Award was inaugurated by the Washington Science Fiction Association in 2007. The award is open to works of imaginative literature (e.g. science fiction, fantasy, horror) published in English for the first time in the previous calendar year. Furthermore, the Small Press Award is limited to short fiction—works under 20,000 words in length—that was published by a small press. The nominees are narrowed down by a panel elected by the WSFA membership, and these finalists are then judged by the entire WSFA membership to select a winner. Throughout the process, the author and publisher of each story are kept anonymous.

The winning story is announced at Capclave, the WSFA convention held in the Washington, D.C. area each October.

Winners
 2007 Award: "El Regalo" by Peter S. Beagle (published in The Line Between, Tachyon Publications)
 2008 Award: "The Wizard of Macatawa" by Tom Doyle (published in Paradox Magazine, Issue 11)
 2009 Award: "The Absence of Stars: Part One" by Greg Siewert (published in Orson Scott Card's InterGalactic Medicine Show, December 2008)
 2010 Award: "Siren Beat" by Tansy Rayner Roberts (published by Twelfth Planet Press, October 2009)
 2011 Award: "Amaryllis" by Carrie Vaughn (published in Lightspeed Magazine, June 2010)
 2012 Award: "The Patrician" by Tansy Rayner Roberts (published in Love and Romanpunk, Twelfth Planet Press, May 2011)
 2013 Award: "Good Hunting" by Ken Liu (published in Strange Horizons, October 2012)
 2014 Award: "Explaining Cthulhu to Grandma" by Alex Shvartsman (published in Orson Scott Card's InterGalactic Medicine Show, April 2013)
 2015 Award: "Jackalope Wives" by Ursula Vernon (published in Apex Magazine January 2014)
 2016 Award: "Today I Am Paul" by Martin L. Shoemaker (published in Clarkesworld August 2015)
 2017 Award: "The Tomato Thief" by Ursula Vernon (published in Apex Magazine January 2016)
 2018 Award: "The Secret Life of Bots" by Suzanne Palmer (published in Clarkesworld September 2017)
 2019 Award: "The Thing in the Walls Wants Your Small Change" by Virginia M. Mohlere (published in Luna Station Quarterly May 2018)
 2020 Award: "The Partisan and the Witch" by Charlotte Honigman (published in Skull & Pestle: New Tales of Baba Yaga, edited by Kate Wolford (World Weaver Press, 2019)
 2021 Award: "Metal Like Blood in the Dark" by T. Kingfisher (published in Uncanny Magazine, (September/October 2020) edited by Lynne M. Thomas and Michael Damian Thomas)

References

External links
 WSFA Small Press Award
 Washington Science Fiction Association
 Capclave

American literary awards
Fantasy awards
Science fiction awards
W
Awards established in 2007
2007 establishments in Washington, D.C.